Jean Charles Fernandez (born 20 January 1998), is a Guinean footballer who currently plays as a defender or midfielder for ASIL Lysi.

Career statistics

Club

Notes

International

References

External links
Jean Charles Fernandez at Footballdatabase

1998 births
Living people
Guinean footballers
Guinean expatriate footballers
Association football defenders
Association football midfielders
Doxa Katokopias FC players
ASIL Lysi players
Cypriot First Division players
Expatriate footballers in Cyprus
Guinea international footballers
Guinea A' international footballers
Guinean expatriate sportspeople in Cyprus
2018 African Nations Championship players